Wind power in Romania has total cumulative installed capacity of 3,028 MW as of the end of 2016, up from the 14 MW installed capacity in 2009.

Romania has the highest wind potential in continental Europe of 14,000 MW; in 2009 investors already had connection requests of 12,000 MW and the national electricity transport company Transelectrica offered permits for 2,200 MW. 
A study of Erste Bank places Romania and especially the Dobrogea Region with Constanța and Tulcea counties as the second best place in Europe (after Scotland) to construct wind farms due to its large wind potential. 
Another study made by the Romanian Energy Institute (REI) said that wind farms could contribute with 13 GW to the national power generation capacity by 2020, and between 2009 and 2017 total wind farm capacity will comprise 4,000 MW with investments of US$5.6 billion.

Potential offshore wind farms may increase supply. Romania passed a law in November 2020 to support offshore wind power.

See also

List of wind farms in Romania
Energy in Romania
Solar power in Romania
Geothermal power in Romania
Hydroelectricity in Romania
Renewable energy by country

References

 
Romania